Kant-Studien ("Kant Studies") is a quarterly journal of philosophy, focusing on Immanuel Kant. The journal was established in 1897. It publishes articles in English and German.

See also
 List of philosophy journals

References

External links
 Kant-Studien – Philosophische Zeitschrift der Kant-Gesellschaft

Bilingual magazines
De Gruyter academic journals
Journals about philosophers
Publications established in 1897
Quarterly journals
Works about Immanuel Kant